Zhou Qian (Chinese: 周倩; pinyin: Zhōu Qiàn; born March 11, 1989)  is a wrestler from China. She won the Bronze medal at the 2014 World Wrestling Championships. She also won the Silver medal at the 2015 World Wrestling Championships and the Bronze medal at the 2015 Asian Wrestling Championships.

In 2021, she won one of the bronze medals in the women's 76 kg event at the 2020 Summer Olympics in Tokyo, Japan.

References

External links 
 

1989 births
Living people
Chinese female sport wrestlers
World Wrestling Championships medalists
Wrestlers at the 2018 Asian Games
Asian Games gold medalists for China
Asian Games medalists in wrestling
Medalists at the 2018 Asian Games
Asian Wrestling Championships medalists
Olympic wrestlers of China
Wrestlers at the 2020 Summer Olympics
Medalists at the 2020 Summer Olympics
Olympic bronze medalists for China
Olympic medalists in wrestling
21st-century Chinese women